Glessie Mitchell "Tiny" Ladson (October 2, 1896 -  April 16, 1934) was a professional American football guard in the National Football League (NFL). He played with the Evansville Crimson Giants  in 1922.

External links
Pro-Football reference

1896 births
1934 deaths
Players of American football from Indiana
Evansville Crimson Giants players